Bompiani is a surname. Notable people with the surname include:

Clelia Bompiani (1848–1927), Italian painter
Roberto Bompiani (1821–1908), Italian painter and sculptor
Augusto Bompiani (1852-1930), Italian painter
Valentino Bompiani (1898–1992), Italian publisher, writer and playwright